Daniel Fredrik Granli (born 1 May 1994) is a Norwegian footballer who plays for AaB in the Danish Superliga. Historically a right back, since 2018 he is mainly a centre-back.

Career

Club career
He is a son of former goalkeeper Espen Granli, and hails from Lier. After starting his youth career in Lier he went on to Bærum and Stabæk. He made his senior team debut in April 2013, when Stabæk was languishing in the 1. divisjon, in a match against Kongsvinger. He subsequently signed the professional contract. Stabæk was promoted, and he made his first-tier debut in March 2014 against Sogndal.

On 28 January 2019 Granli signed with Swedish AIK on a four year contract. However, he was loaned out to Danish Superliga club AaB on 3 September 2020 for the rest of the year with an option to buy. On 6 January 2021 AaB confirmed, that they had triggered the buying option.

Career statistics

Club

References

1994 births
Living people
People from Lier, Norway
Norwegian footballers
Norway international footballers
Norwegian expatriate footballers
Bærum SK players
Stabæk Fotball players
AIK Fotboll players
AaB Fodbold players
Norwegian First Division players
Eliteserien players
Allsvenskan players
Danish Superliga players
Association football defenders
Norwegian expatriate sportspeople in Sweden
Norwegian expatriate sportspeople in Denmark
Expatriate footballers in Sweden
Expatriate men's footballers in Denmark
Sportspeople from Viken (county)